Qullpani (Aymara qullpa saltpeter, -ni a suffix, "the one with saltpeter", also spelled Kollpani) is a  mountain in the Andes of Bolivia. It is located in the Potosí Department, Nor Chichas Province, Cotagaita Municipality.

References 

Mountains of Potosí Department